The cingulate gyrus commences below the rostrum of the corpus callosum, curves around in front of the genu, extends along the upper surface of the body, and finally turns downward behind the splenium, where it is connected by a narrow isthmus with the parahippocampal gyrus.

Additional images

References

External links
 http://braininfo.rprc.washington.edu/whereisit.aspx?language=0&requestID=ID163&parentID=ID159&originalID=ID163
 https://web.archive.org/web/20091029114245/http://bstr431.biostr.washington.edu/syl/lab7/lab7.htm

Gyri
Medial surface of cerebral hemisphere